Henk Nijdam (26 August 1935 – 30 April 2009) was a Dutch road and track cyclist. His sporting career began with Fortuna Zundert. On track, he finished in fifth place in the 4 km team pursuit at the 1960 Summer Olympics. He also won a gold and a bronze medals in the individual pursuit at world championships in 1962 and 1963.

His best achievements on the road were winning the Olympia's Tour in 1964 and two stages of the Tour de France in 1964 and 1966.

Nijdam was the father of cyclist Jelle Nijdam.

Major results

1960
 National Track Pursuit Championship
1961
 Amateur World Track Pursuit Championship
Ronde van Midden-Nederland
1962
 World Track Pursuit Championship
Olympia's Tour
1964
Tour de France:
Winner stage 6
Oirschot
Made
1965
Maarheeze
Mijl van Mares
Kwaadmechelen
1966
Eeklo
 National Track Pursuit Championship
Nationale Sluitingsprijs
Ulvenhout
Valkenswaard
Tour de France:
Winner stage 20
Vuelta a España:
Winner stages 8, 10B and 16
1967
Beervelde
 National Track Pursuit Championship
Vuelta a España:
Winner stage 12
1968
Essen
Kortenhoef
Rijkevorsel

See also
 List of Dutch Olympic cyclists

References

External links

1935 births
2009 deaths
People from Haren, Groningen
Dutch Tour de France stage winners
Dutch Vuelta a España stage winners
UCI Track Cycling World Champions (men)
Olympic cyclists of the Netherlands
Cyclists at the 1960 Summer Olympics
Cyclists from Groningen (province)
Dutch track cyclists
20th-century Dutch people
21st-century Dutch people